GriGris is a 2013 French-Chadian drama film directed by Mahamat Saleh Haroun, starring Soulémane Démé, Mariam Monory, Cyril Guei and Marius Yelolo. It is about a 25-year-old man with a paralysed leg who dreams of becoming a dancer, and starts to work for a gang of petrol smugglers. The film was produced through the French Pili Films with co-production support from the Chadian Goï Goï Productions. It also received support from Canal+, Ciné+, TV5Monde, Canal Horizons and the CNC. Filming started 29 October 2012.

The film was nominated for the Palme d'Or at the 2013 Cannes Film Festival and won the Vulcan Award. The film was selected as the Chadian entry for the Best Foreign Language Film at the 86th Academy Awards, but it was not nominated. The film also screened at the 36th Denver Film Festival.

See also
 List of submissions to the 86th Academy Awards for Best Foreign Language Film
 List of Chadian submissions for the Academy Award for Best Foreign Language Film

References

External links
 

2013 films
2013 drama films
Films directed by Mahamat-Saleh Haroun
Chadian drama films
French drama films
2010s French-language films
2010s Arabic-language films
2013 multilingual films
French multilingual films
2010s French films